Senjeh District is one of four administrative districts of Bomi County, Liberia. As of 2008 the population was 29,325.

References

Districts of Liberia
Bomi County